Max Schwitalla (born 16 June 2000) is a German footballer who plays as a midfielder.

Career
On 4 March 2021, Schwitalla joined FSV Optik Rathenow. He left at the end of the season.

References

External links
 

2000 births
Living people
German footballers
Association football midfielders
FC Rot-Weiß Erfurt players
FSV Optik Rathenow players
3. Liga players